Wetter (Ruhr) station is in the district of Vorhalle in the centre of the city Wetter (Ruhr) in the German state of North Rhine-Westphalia. It is served by regional services and Rhine-Ruhr S-Bahn line S 5.

History 

The station is located on the Elberfeld–Dortmund line and was opened on 9 March 1849 as a through station by the Bergisch-Märkische Railway Company. The original station building, which was built in 1850, was demolished by the Prussian state railways and replaced by the existing building in 1905.

On 17 March 1920 there was fighting at the station during the Ruhr Uprising, between units of the Ruhr Red Army and a vanguard of the Freikorps Lichtschlag, in response to the Kapp Putsch. A plaque commemorates the events.

In 1994, line S 5 services of the Rhine-Ruhr S-Bahn began operating on the line through the station and regional service N 33 was discontinued.

Today the station building is no longer used by the railway. Instead the city library has been located here since 2007. A catering business has also occupied the building since the spring of 2008.

Train services
The station is currently served by S 5 services at 30-minute intervals, hourly services of the Ruhr-Lenne-Bahn (RB 40) and hourly services of the Ruhr-Lenne-Express (RE 16). These three services are now operated by DB Regio NRW. It is also served by hourly Wupper-Express (RE 4) services, operated by National Express. Long-distance passenger services pass through without stopping. Freight trains do not regularly operate through the station, because freight trains use the Ruhr Valley line on the other side of the Ruhr.

The station is also a bus junction and an important point of interchange between rail and urban transport. It is served by the express bus route SB38 and city bus lines 541, 553, 555, 591, 592, 593 and 595, operated by Hagener Straßenbahn AG, Verkehrsgesellschaft Ennepe-Ruhr and Busverkehr Rheinland, at hourly intervals.

Station
The station is currently classified as a category 5 station. It is considered as a halt from an operational point of view, as all crossovers have been removed. Between the two tracks there is a central platform, which can be accessed via a staircase, but it can also be accessed by barrier-free ramps so that wheelchair users can reach trains without help. There is a parking garage next to the station, used by park-and-ride commuters. The station is close to the Ruhrtal Center, a shopping centre.

References

Railway stations in North Rhine-Westphalia
Rhine-Ruhr S-Bahn stations
S5 (Rhine-Ruhr S-Bahn)
Railway stations in Germany opened in 1849
1849 establishments in Prussia
Buildings and structures in Ennepe-Ruhr-Kreis